A level crossing is an intersection where a railway line crosses a road, path, or (in rare situations) airport runway, at the same level, as opposed to the railway line crossing over or under using an overpass or tunnel. The term also applies when a light rail line with separate right-of-way or reserved track crosses a road in the same fashion. Other names include railway level crossing, railway crossing (chiefly international), grade crossing or railroad crossing (chiefly American), road through railroad, criss-cross, train crossing, and RXR (abbreviated).

There are more than 100,000 level crossings in Europe and more than 200,000 in North America.

History 

The history of level crossings depends on the location, but often early level crossings had a flagman in a nearby booth who would, on the approach of a train, wave a red flag or lantern to stop all traffic and clear the tracks. Gated crossings became commonplace in many areas, as they protected the railway from people trespassing and livestock, and they protected the users of the crossing when closed by the signalman/gateman. In the second quarter of the 20th century, manual or electrical closable gates that barricaded the roadway started to be introduced, intended to be a complete barrier against intrusion of any road traffic onto the railway. Automatic crossings are now commonplace in some countries as motor vehicles replaced horse-drawn vehicles and the need for animal protection diminished with time. Full, half or no barrier crossings superseded gated crossings, although crossings of older types can still be found in places. 
In rural regions with sparse traffic, the least expensive type of level crossing to operate is one without flagmen or gates, with only a warning sign posted. This type has been common across North America and in many developing countries.

Some international rules have helped to harmonize level crossing. For instance, the 1968 Vienna Convention states (chapter 3, article 23b) that:
 "one or two blinking red light indicates a car should stop; if they are yellow the car can pass with caution".
 Article 27 suggests stop lines at level crossings.
 Article 33, 34, 35 and 36 are specific to level crossings, because level crossings are recognized as dangerous.
 Article 35 indicates a cross should exist when there is no barrier or lights.
This has been implemented in many countries, including countries which are not part of the Vienna Convention.

Safety

Trains have a much larger mass relative to their braking capability, and thus a far longer braking distance than road vehicles. With rare exceptions, trains do not stop at level crossings and rely on vehicles and pedestrians to clear the tracks in advance.

Level crossings constitute a significant safety concern internationally. On average, each year around 400 people in the European Union and over 300 in the United States are killed in level crossing accidents. Collisions can occur with vehicles as well as pedestrians; pedestrian collisions are more likely to result in a fatality. Among pedestrians, young people (5–19 years), older people (60 years and over), and males are considered to be higher risk users.

As far as warning systems for road users are concerned, level crossings either have "passive" protection, in the form of various types of warning signs, or "active" protection, using automatic warning devices such as flashing lights, warning sounds, and barriers or gates. In the 19th century and for much of the 20th, a sign warning "Stop, look, and listen" (or similar wording) was the sole protection at most level crossings. Today, active protection is widely available, and fewer collisions take place at level crossings with active warning systems. Modern radar sensor systems can detect if level crossings are free of obstructions as trains approach. These improve safety by not lowering crossing barriers that may trap vehicles or pedestrians on the tracks, while signalling trains to brake until the obstruction clears (however, they cannot prevent a vehicle from moving out onto the track once it's far too late for the locomotive to slow even slightly).

At railway stations, a pedestrian level crossing is sometimes provided to allow passengers to reach other platforms in the absence of an underpass or bridge, or for disabled access. Where third rail systems have level crossings, there is a gap in the third rail over the level crossing, but this does not necessarily interrupt the power supply to trains since they may have current collectors on multiple cars.

Source: US Department of Transportation.
(1 mile=1.6km)

Source: Eurostat: The rail accident data are provided to Eurostat by the European Railway Agency (ERA). The ERA manages and is responsible for the entire data collection. The Eurostat data constitute a part of the data collected by ERA and are part of the so-called Common Safety Indicators (CSIs).
Note: Since 2010, use of national definitions is no longer permitted: 2010 CSI data represent the first fully harmonized set of figures

 Source: Eurostat: Annual number of victims by type of accident [rail_ac_catvict] Last update: 09-02-2017

 Source, Federal Railroad Administration

Traffic signal preemption

Traffic signal-controlled intersections next to level crossings on at least one of the roads in the intersection usually feature traffic signal preemption. Approaching trains activate a routine where, before the road lights and barriers are activated, all traffic signal phases go to red, except for the signal immediately after the crossing, which turns green (or flashing yellow) to allow traffic on the tracks to clear (in some cases, there are auxiliary traffic signals prior to the railroad crossing which will turn red, keeping new traffic from crossing the tracks. This is in addition to the flashing lights on the crossing barriers). After enough time to clear the crossing, the signal will turn. The crossing lights may begin flashing and the barriers lower immediately, or this might be delayed until after the traffic light turns red.

The operation of a traffic signal, while a train is present, may differ from municipality to municipality. In some areas, all directions will flash red, turning the intersection into an all-way stop. In other areas, the traffic parallel to the railroad track will have a flashing yellow for the duration of the train while the other directions face a flashing red light for the duration of the train. Still in other areas, the traffic parallel to the railroad track will have a green light for the duration of the train while the other directions face a red light for the duration of the train. Further still, in other areas traffic lights can operate relatively normally with only the blocked direction turning red for the duration of the train.

Crossing cameras 

In France, cameras have been installed on some level crossings to obtain images to improve understanding of an incident when a technical investigation occurs.

In England, cameras have been installed at some level crossings.

In South Australia, cameras have been installed at some level crossings to deter non-compliance with signals.

By country

Designs of level crossings vary country-to-country.

Major accidents

Level crossings present a significant risk of collisions between trains and road vehicles. This list is not a definitive list of the world's worst accidents and the events listed are limited to those where a separate article describes the event in question.

Runway crossings

Aircraft runways sometimes cross roads or rail lines, and require signaling to avoid collisions.

Australia
 Kingsford Smith Airport had a runway crossing, when that runway was extended. The railway was later deviated with sharp curves to avoid that runway.
 Burnie Airport had a runway crossing over the 05/23 Runway. This crossing was built over the railway line when the airfield was constructed, and has since been decommissioned with the closing of both the railway line and the 05/23 runway.

Gibraltar

Winston Churchill Avenue intersects the runway of Gibraltar International Airport at surface level; movable barricades close when aircraft land or take off.

Madagascar

The Fianarantsoa-Côte Est railway crosses the runway at Manakara Airport. It is one of the few airports in the world that crosses an active railway line.

New Zealand
A level crossing near Gisborne, sees the Palmerston North - Gisborne Line cross one of Gisborne Airport's runways. Aircraft landing on sealed 1310-metre runway 14L/32R are signalled with two red flashing lights on either side of the runway and a horizontal bar of flashing red lights to indicate the runway south of the railway line is closed, and may only land on the  section of the runway north of the railway line. When the full length of the runway is open, a vertical bar of green lights signal to the aircraft, with regular rail signals on either side of the runway indicating trains to stop.

Nicaragua
The runway of Ometepe Airport crosses the highway NIC-64.

Sweden
The Visby Lärbro Line between Visby and Lärbro crossed the runway of Visby Airport between 1956 and 1960.

United Kingdom
 Northern Ireland: There was a runway crossing on the Belfast–Derry railway line. The runway was interlocked with conventional railway block instruments to the control tower.
 Scotland: Road crossing of (Shetland) A970 with Sumburgh Airport's runway.

See also

At-grade intersection
 At-grade railway
Billups Neon Crossing Signal
Boom barrier
 Breakover angle
:Category:Level crossing accidents
Crossbuck
Four-quadrant gate
Grade separation
Level crossing signals
Lists of rail accidents
List of train accidents by death toll
List of road accidents
 Pedestrian crossing
 Warning sign
Whistle post
Wigwag
 Occupation crossing

References

Bibliography

External links

Web Accident Prediction System - Highway-rail crossing data from the U.S. Federal Railroad Administration, Office of Safety Analysis

Traffic signs
 
Rail junction types
Road infrastructure
Road hazards
Articles containing video clips